AKK-Motorsport is a Finnish motorsport organisation which governs over 320 member clubs in the country. The organisation is a member in Fédération Internationale de l'Automobile, and representing Finland there is its most important duty. AKK-Motorsport has divided Finland into 8 sections, which all have their local committees. They organise driver examination and education.

, the President of the AKK-Motorsport is Juhani Pakari.

Results

FIA Motorsport Games F4 Cup

SMP F4 Championship

External links 

National sporting authorities of the FIA
Radio-controlled car racing organizations

Finnish auto racing teams